Rebecca Handke (born 2 October 1986 in Soest, West Germany) is a German former pair skater. With partner Daniel Wende, she is the 2005-2006 German national silver medalist.

Career 
Rebecca Handke represented the club SC Moehnesee as a pair skater with skating partner Daniel Wende. They were first coached by Julia Gnilozoubova. From 2004 on, their coach was Knut Schubert. After 2004, Handke and Wende trained in Dortmund and in Berlin. The pair achieved their highest international result of 6th at the 2005 European Championships.

In March 2006, Handke had a surgery due to knee problems. Handke and Wende ended their partnership following the 2006–2007 season. She trained for a short time with Canadian skater Christopher Richardson until July 2007, but never competed with him. Handke retired from competitive skating following the 2007–2008 season.

Personal life 
Handke attended school at the Conrad-von-Soest-Gymnasium in Soest and passed her Abitur later by long distance studies. On 1 July 2005, she became a member of the Sportsoldatin of the Bundeswehr.

Programs 
(with Wende)

Competitive highlights
(with Wende)

References

External links

 

German female pair skaters
1986 births
Living people
Sportspeople from Arnsberg (region)
People from Soest, Germany